Antonio Vivaldi made several versions of his G minor setting of the  canticle. He scored his best known version, RV 610, for vocal soloists, four-part choir, oboes and string orchestra, which also exists in a version for two groups of performers (RV 210a). He based these versions on an earlier setting for voices and strings only (RV 610b). His ultimate version, in which some choral and ensemble movements are replaced by five arias, to be sung a cappella by girls from the Ospedale della Pietà orphanage, was catalogued as RV 611. The concise work is well suited for use in vesper services.

Versions

History 
Vivaldi worked in Venice as a priest and director of music at an orphanage for girls, Ospedale della Pietà, and left a substantial amount of sacred music.

He composed settings of the  canticle, a regular part of vesper services. Musicologists differ in dating the works, for example before 1717 or in 1719. According to the musicologist Michael Talbot, Vivaldi wrote the earliest version in G minor for the orphanage c. 1715, and copied it for a Cistercian monastery of Osek soon afterwards. He revised it in the 1720s, making the tenor and bass parts more suitable to male voices, and adding two oboes, which he used prominently as obbligato instruments in an expanded version of "Sicut locutus est". This version became known as RV 610. While Vivaldi assigned two choirs, with instructions in the choral movements to use one or the other or both, it remains monochoral music. Vivaldi wrote a later setting, RV 611, which retained the choral sections but replaced the three sections for solo voices by five more elaborate arias, in which individual girls from the orphanage could show off their skills. Their names were noted in the score.

Structure and scoring 
Vivaldi structured the Magnificat, RV 610, in nine movements, eight for the text of the canticle (Luke 1:46-55) and the conclusion for the doxology. The following table shows the title, voices, tempo marking, time, key and text source for the nine movements. A performance requires approximately 15 minutes. A performance of RV 611, with the elaborate arias, takes around 20 minutes.

Movements 

Vivaldi interpreted each verse of the Magnificat canticle with different musical material but kept the work concise. Michael Talbot characterised the movements in liner notes:

1 
The first movement expresses the magnification, "" (My soul magnifies the Lord), with a striking upward chromatic passage in slow tempo.

2 
In the second movement, three passages of the verse are given to different solo voices in an aria a tre. "" (And my spirit rejoices) is sung by the soprano, "" (because he regarded the humility of his servant) by the alto, with a choral entry to illustrate "" (all generations), and the passage "" (because he did great things for me) by the tenor.

3 
The third movement, "", speaks of the mercy of the Lord for all who fear him. Both mercy and fear are expressed in a dense tecture of imitative music, with chromatic lines and leaps of minor sixths and major sevenths, called "anguished intervals".

4 
The fourth movement, "" (He exerts power), is a fast, powerful choral movement.

5 
The next verse, "", describes how the mighty are thrown from their seats while the humble are exalted. Vivaldi expresses it in graphically dramatic unison lines of the choir.

6 
In the sixth movement, "", a duet of sopranos, often in parallel lines, illustrates how the hungry are filled with good things, on an ostinato figure in the bass line.

7 
The seventh movement, "", is a short chorale movement saying that the Lord sustains Israel, adding in a faster middle section "" (remembering his mercy).

8 
The eighth movement, "" (As He has promised our fathers), is a cheerful trio for three soloists and two obbligato oboes. A reviewer described the lines of oboes and bassoon as "bubbly", in dialogue with "lively transparent vocal lines".

9 
The final movement adds the traditional doxology on the biblical text "" (Glory to the Father). The music recalls the beginning of the first movement, with a long chromatic melisma on "" (holy). "" (As it was in the beginning) is also reminiscent of the first movement but leads to a traditional double fugue treatment of "" (and for ever and ever) in one voice and simultaneously "Amen" in another.

Publications 
Carus-Verlag published two versions of Vivaldi's Magnificat, RV 610 and RV 611, in 1978. Bärenreiter published an arrangement of both versions for voices and organ in 2004.

Selected Recordings
In 1964 a version by Carlo Felice Cillario conducting the Angelicum Chamber Orchestra featuring soloists Emilia Cundari, Angela Vercelli, and Anna Maria Rota was released.  This recording was released in the United States in 1968 by Musical Heritage Society.  In 1994, a recording was made by The King's Consort and Choir, conducted by Robert King. A 2002 recording was performed by the Estonian Philharmonic Chamber Choir with soloists and the Tallinn Chamber Orchestra, conducted by Tonu Kaljuste. In 2015, the work was recorded, along with Vivaldi's Gloria, by Le Concert Spirituel conducted by Herve Niquet. The soprano and alto choir sections perform the solo movements in this performance, which was also presented at the Festival Oude Muziek in Utrecht.

References

External links 

 
 
 

Compositions by Antonio Vivaldi
Vivaldi
Compositions in G minor